UBC Magnofit Güssing Knights is a professional basketball club based in Güssing, Austria. The team played in the Austrian ÖBL, but in April 2016 the team was disqualified from the league.

History
In the 2013–14 season, the Knights shocked Austria by taking the national title by beating top seeded ece Bulls Kapfenberg 3–2 in the Finals. They turned around a 0–2 deficit to the Bulls. Before the season the Knight were predicted to end on the 7th place by surveys around the league. The following season, the Knights would make their debut in Europe. The team entered the 2014–15 EuroChallenge regular season.

After another national title in 2015, things were looking bright for Knights. However, in the 2015–16 season the team had financial problems. This eventually resulted in the licence of the club being taken by the ÖBL, and the team was disqualified from the ÖBL season in April 2016.

Sponsorship names
Until 2004: UBBC Guttomat Güssing
2004–2008: Güssing Knights
2008–2012: UBC ökoStadt Güssing Knights
2012–2016: UBC Magnofit Güssing Knights

Honours
Austrian Championship (2):
2013–14, 2014–15
Austrian Cup (1):
2015

Season by season

External links
Team profile at eurobasket.com
Official website

References

Basketball teams in Austria
Güssing
Basketball teams established in 1957